Illán de Vacas is a town in the province of Toledo, in Castile–La Mancha, Spain. The surface area of the municipality is 9 km², it has a total population of 3 inhabitants, making it the least populated municipality in Spain.

Illán de Vacas belongs to the "comarca" of Torrijos. It is bordered on the north by the municipality of Los Cerralbos, on the northwest by Otero, on the east by Domingo Pérez, on the south by Cebolla and on the west by Lucillos.

The town lies at an elevation of roughly 480 m, and 59 km west of Toledo and 35 km east of Talavera de la Reina, on the railway line between Talavera and Torrijos. It is approximately 95 km southwest of Madrid.

The mayor of Illán de Vacas is Mr. Julián Renilla Bru of the Partido Popular. In the 2004 General Election in Spain, all four votes cast at Illán de Vacas went to the Partido Popular.

The municipality contains a church consecrated to the Assumption of Our Lady (Iglesia de la Asunción de Nuestra Señora).

Toponymy
The word Illán derives from the Latin Iulianus. The town’s name stems from the worship of San Illán or San Julián (“Saint Julian”). The word de simply means “of”. The last word, Vacas, despite its current meaning in Spanish – namely “cows” – apparently has an Arabic origin, deriving from a word Wakka. In a document from the latter half of the 16th century, it says that the town’s name is “Vacas”, and that a fortunate man named Illán lived there.

Demographics
The following table shows the population development between 1996 and 2007 according to data from the Instituto Nacional de Estadística (INE). With 5 inhabitants, according to the INE's 2011 census, Illán de Vacas is one of Spain's two smallest municipalities by population. At one point (1991), it even temporarily became a ghost town.

History
In the past, the town was tied to Los Cerralbos with its beginnings as a workhouse. Illán de Vacas appears in a 1512 document that indicates that three soldiers were captured here. In the 17th century, this hamlet was repopulated with 37 families. In the mid 19th century, it had 22 houses and the municipal budget rose to 2,200 reales, of which 800 reales were used to pay the secretary.

References

External links
 General election results (2004) in Illán de Vacas 

Municipalities in the Province of Toledo